Neve Avot, also known as the Shoham Combined Centre for Geriatric Medicine, is a geriatric hospital in Israel. The center is located on the northern outskirts of Pardes Hanna-Karkur, but is recognized as a separate locality.

History
The hospital was established in 1948.

References

External links
Official website

Hospitals in Israel
Populated places established in 1948
1948 establishments in Israel
Pardes Hanna-Karkur
Populated places in Haifa District